Kazimierz de Rostwo-Suski (21 September 1891 – 9 March 1974) was a Polish equestrian. He competed in two events at the 1924 Summer Olympics.

References

External links
 

1891 births
1974 deaths
Polish male equestrians
Olympic equestrians of Poland
Equestrians at the 1924 Summer Olympics
People from Rivne Oblast